C. dichotoma  may refer to:
 Callicarpa dichotoma, the purple beautyberry or early amethyst, a plant species
 Caulerpa dichotoma, a green alga species
 Ceropegia dichotoma, the cardoncillo, a flowering plant species endemic to the Canary Islands
 Clidemia dichotoma, a plant species in the genus Clidemia
 Cordia dichotoma, the fragrant manjack or the bird lime tree, a plant species

See also
 Dichotoma